Phyllophoraceae is a family of red algae in the order Gigartinales.

Genera
The World Register of Marine Species includes the following genera in the family Phyllophoraceae:

Ahnfeltiopsis P.C.Silva & DeCew, 1992
Archestenogramma C.W.Schneider, Chengsupanimit & G.W.Saunders, 2011
Besa Setchell, 1912
Ceratocolax Rosenvinge, 1898
Coccotylus Kützing, 1843
Erythrodermis Batters, 1900
Fredericqia Maggs, Le Gall, Mineur, Provan & G.W.Saunders, 2013
Gymnogongrus Martius, 1833
Lukinia Perestenko, 1996
Mastocarpus Kützing, 1843
Ozophora J.Agardh, 1892
Petroglossum Hollenberg, 1943
Phyllophora Greville, 1830
Schottera Guiry & Hollenberg, 1975
Stenogramma Harvey, 1840

References

 
Red algae families